Ohad Cohen (born 10 June 1975) is an Israeli footballer who plays in the goalkeeper position for Hapoel Kfar Saba.

External links
Club bio

1975 births
Living people
Israeli Jews
Israeli footballers
Maccabi Petah Tikva F.C. players
Hapoel Mahane Yehuda F.C. players
Hapoel Petah Tikva F.C. players
Hapoel Beit She'an F.C. players
Beitar Jerusalem F.C. players
Hapoel Haifa F.C. players
Hapoel Be'er Sheva F.C. players
Hapoel Rishon LeZion F.C. players
Hapoel Ra'anana A.F.C. players
Hapoel Kfar Saba F.C. players
Liga Leumit players
Israeli Premier League players
Association football goalkeepers
Footballers from Petah Tikva